Oberalp Pass ( or Cuolm d'Ursera) (2044 meters above sea level) is a high mountain pass in the Swiss Alps connecting the cantons of Graubünden and Uri between Disentis/Mustér and Andermatt.

Winter closure
The public road that crosses the pass is closed in winter, but the Furka-Oberalp railway line, now part of the Matterhorn Gotthard Bahn, runs year round and provides a limited shuttle for cars in winter (reservation required). When the road closes depends on snowfall and varies between the end of October and the beginning of December. The road opens again in spring, usually by the end of April but sometimes not until mid May.

In winter, a ski area extends to the Graubünden side, connecting the pass well into the Tujetsch territory to Dieni, near Rueras.

Source of the Rhine river
The Rhine springs from a source nearby (Tomasee), which can be accessed by hiking two hours from Oberalp Pass. A multiday trekking route is signposted across Oberalp pass and along the young Rhine called Senda Sursilvana.

Oberalpsee is located 20 m below, in the direction of Andermatt.

Railway station

A railway station is located next to the Oberalppass road. It is at the base of the Oberalp ski area. The station is owned and run by the Matterhorn Gotthard Bahn. It has 3 platforms, one of which is a bay platform from Andermatt, and is often closed during the winter. The railway on both sides of the station is a single line, so Oberalppass is an important passing place. The station is the highest point on the Matterhorn Gotthard Bahn network.

Ski Area

The Oberalp Pass passes the Oberalp ski area, which is part of the Gotthard Oberalp Arena.

There are currently plans for the ski area to be linked up with Nätschen, the neighbouring mountain, which is also part of the Gotthard Oberalp Arena.

Gallery

See also
 List of highest paved roads in Europe
 List of mountain passes
 List of the highest Swiss passes
 Gotthard Oberalp Arena

References

External links 

Profile on climbbybike.com
Map, photos, cycing elevation chart - both sides

Mountain passes of Switzerland
Mountain passes of the Alps
Mountain passes of Graubünden
Mountain passes of the canton of Uri
Ski areas and resorts in Switzerland
Graubünden–Uri border
Rail mountain passes of Switzerland
Andermatt
Tujetsch